Sort Of is the debut studio album by the avant-rock band Slapp Happy. It was recorded in Wümme, Bremen, Germany in May and June 1972 with Faust as their backing band, and released on LP by Polydor Records in 1972. In 1980 Recommended Records released a limited edition of Sort Of on LP, and the album was reissued on CD by Blueprint Records in 1999 with one bonus track.

Track listing
All titles written by Peter Blegvad and Anthony Moore.

Personnel
Peter Blegvad – guitar, saxophone, vocals
Dagmar Krause (credited as "Daggi") – vocals, tambourine, piano, woodblock
Anthony Moore – guitar, keyboards, vocals
Gunther Wüsthoff – saxophone on "Paradise Express" and "I'm All Alone"
Werner "Zappi" Diermaier – drums
Jean-Hervé Péron – bass guitar

Engineered by Kurt Graupner
Album design and cover by David Larcher

Notes
Gunther, Zappi and Jean recorded through courtesy of Faust

CD releases
Sort Of was released on CD by Blueprint Records in 1999 with an extra track (from the B-side of their single "Just a Conversation"):
"Jumpin' Jonah'" (Moore/Blegvad) – the CD was mastered from a vinyl copy as the master tapes had been lost
The same master was also issued in Japan with an additional 3" CD single:
"Alcohol" (Blegvad)

References

External links
Peter Blegvad Discography
Sort Of. The Faust Pages

1972 debut albums
Slapp Happy albums
Polydor Records albums
Recommended Records albums
Albums produced by Uwe Nettelbeck